This is a list of lighthouses in Guadeloupe.

Lighthouses

See also
 Lists of lighthouses and lightvessels

References

External links

 

Guadeloupe
Lighthouses